Plasmodium beebei is a parasite of the genus Plasmodium subgenus Lacertamoeba.

Like all Plasmodium species P. beebei has both vertebrate and insect hosts. The vertebrate hosts for this parasite are reptiles.

Description 
The parasite was first described by Telford in 1978.

Geographical occurrence 
This species is found in Venezuela, South America.

Clinical features and host pathology 
The only known host is the lizard Gonatodes taniae.

References 

beebei